Roger Arthur "Butch" Wedge (born January 3, 1948) is a Canadian former politician. He served in the Legislative Assembly of New Brunswick from 1982 to 1987 as member of the Progressive Conservative party from the constituency of Saint John West.

References

1948 births
Living people